Aleksandra Romanovna Pospelova (born 22 April 1998) is a Russian professional tennis player.

Pospelova has won two singles and ten doubles titles on the ITF Circuit. She reached her career-high singles ranking of world No. 537 on 6 February 2017, and her career-high doubles ranking of No. 310 on 23 October 2017.

In 2015, Pospelova won the girls' doubles title at the US Open, partnering Viktória Kužmová; together they defeated Anna Kalinskaya and Anastasia Potapova in the final.

ITF Circuit finals

Singles: 4 (2 titles, 2 runner-ups)

Doubles: 20 (10 titles, 10 runner-ups)

Junior Grand Slam finals

Girls' doubles

References

External links
 
 
 
 

1998 births
Living people
Tennis players from Moscow
Russian female tennis players
US Open (tennis) junior champions
Grand Slam (tennis) champions in girls' doubles